Ayreon Universe – The Best of Ayreon Live, alternatively known as Ayreon Universe – Best of Ayreon Live or simply Ayreon Universe, is a live album and DVD/Blu-ray by Arjen Anthony Lucassen's progressive rock/metal rock opera project Ayreon, released on March 30, 2018. Unlike Ayreon's first live album The Theater Equation, which was a stage performance of the album The Human Equation, Ayreon Universe was performed as a traditional concert, with two additional songs from Star One, another project by Lucassen. It was recorded during a series of concerts in September 2017, which were the first ever official Ayreon concerts, although The Theater Equation was released (but not performed) as an official Ayreon product.

The performance featured 16 singers, all of whom had previously worked together with Lucassen on his studio albums.

Production

Recording 
It was recorded during a series of concerts in September 2017, which were the first ever official Ayreon concerts; over 9000 fans were present in the attendance, with 30 cameras used for the filming.

Promotion 
Lucassen officially announced the album in January 2018.

On January 30, 2018, Lucassen released the video for "Everybody Dies" on YouTube to promote the upcoming release, calling the track "a personal favorite".

Release 
The album was released on seven different formats: single-disc Blu-ray, 2 DVDs, 2 CDs, 3 black LPs, a 3 gold LPs edition limited to 500 copies, a digital download version, and a "Limited Edition" featuring the contents from all first three editions.

Track listing 

1In order of appearance.

Personnel

 Vocalists 
 Floor Jansen (Nightwish, ex-After Forever, ex-ReVamp)
 Damian Wilson (Headspace, ex-Threshold)
 Hansi Kürsch (Blind Guardian)
 Tommy Karevik (Kamelot, Seventh Wonder)
 Anneke van Giersbergen (Anneke van Giersbergen, The Gentle Storm, VUUR, ex-The Gathering)
 Marko Hietala (ex-Nightwish, ex-Tarot)
 Jonas Renkse (Katatonia, Bloodbath, ex-October Tide)
 Mike Mills (Toehider)
 Marcela Bovio (MaYaN, ex-Stream of Passion, ex-Elfonía)
 Irene Jansen
 Robert Soeterboek (ex-Erik Norlander)
 John Jaycee Cuijpers (Praying Mantis)
 Edward Reekers (ex-Kayak)
 Jay van Feggelen (ex-Bodine)
 Maggy Luyten (Nightmare)
 Lisette van den Berg (Scarlet Stories)

 Instrumentalists
 Ed Warby - drums except on "Comatose" and "And the Druids Turned to Stone", additional vocals in "Day Eleven: Love"
 Johan van Stratum (VUUR, ex-Stream of Passion) - bass, except on  "Intergalactic Space Crusaders"
 Peter Vink - bass in "Intergalactic Space Crusaders"
 Marcel Coenen (Lemur Voice, Sun Caged) - lead guitar
 Ferry Duijsens - guitar
 Joost van den Broek (ex-After Forever) - keyboards
 Ben Mathot - violin
 Jeroen Goossens - flutes, woodwinds
 Maaike Peterse - cello
 Rob Snijders - percussion in "Comatose" and drums on "And the Druids Turned to Stone"
 Arjen Anthony Lucassen - additional guitar and vocals in "Amazing Flight in Space" and "The Eye of Ra"

Charts

References

External links 
 Official Ayreon Website

2018 live albums
Ayreon albums